E. cinnabarina may refer to:

 Echinopsis cinnabarina, a hedgehog cactus
 Euxoa cinnabarina, an owlet moth